Panthera pardus tulliana is a leopard subspecies native to the Iranian Plateau and surrounding areas encompassing Turkey, the Caucasus, Azerbaijan, Georgia, Armenia, Iraq, Iran, Turkmenistan, Afghanistan and possibly Pakistan. Since 2016, it has been listed as Endangered on the IUCN Red List, as the wild population is estimated at less than 1,000 mature individuals.

Common names used for P. p. tulliana include Anatolian leopard, Persian leopard, Caucasian leopard, Balochistan leopard and Asia Minor leopard.

Taxonomy 

Felis tulliana was the scientific name proposed by Achille Valenciennes in 1856, who described a skin and skull from a leopard killed near Smyrna, in western Turkey.
In the 19th and 20th centuries, several naturalists described leopard zoological specimens from the Middle East:
Felis pardus tulliana was proposed by Richard Lydekker in 1899 after examining a leopard skin from the Caucasus.
Felis ciscaucasica was proposed by Konstantin Alekseevich Satunin in 1914, based on a leopard specimen from the Kuban region in the North Caucasus.
Panthera pardus saxicolor was proposed by Reginald Innes Pocock in 1927, who described leopard skins from different areas of Persia, but recognized their similarity to Caucasian leopard skins. His holotype was a skin and a skull of a male leopard from Asterabad.
P. p. sindica was proposed by Pocock in 1930 for a single skin and two skulls from the Kirthar Mountains in Balochistan. He wrote that the skin closely resembled those of P. p. saxicolor, but was distinguishable from the typical Indian leopard (P. p. fusca) in colour. It was subsumed to P. p. saxicolor based on molecular genetic analysis in 1996.

In the 19th and 20th centuries, the Anatolian leopard was considered a distinct leopard subspecies that occurred only in western Turkey. The leopard specimens available in zoological museum collections do not differ significantly in the sizes and shapes of skulls. Therefore, the subspecific names tulliana, ciscaucasica and saxicolor are currently considered synonyms.

An analysis of leopard samples from Afghanistan revealed that they belong to P. p. saxicolor, but intergrade with the Indian leopard (P. p. fusca) in eastern Afghanistan.

In 2017, the Persian leopard population was subsumed to P. p. tulliana, which is the oldest available name for the leopard subspecies in West Asia.

Phylogeny 
A phylogenetic analysis indicates that P. p. tulliana matrilineally belongs to a monophyletic group that diverged from the African (P. p. pardus) and the Arabian leopard (P. p. nimr) in the second half of the Pleistocene. DNA analysis indicates that the leopards in Iran belong to a single gene pool and form a distinct subclade.

Characteristics 

P. p. tulliana has a grayish, slightly reddish fur with large rosettes on the flanks and back, smaller ones on the shoulder and upper legs, and spots on the head and neck. It varies in colouration; in Iran both pale and dark individuals occur.

Distribution and habitat 
It avoids areas with long-duration snow cover and areas near urban development.

In northern Anatolia, zoologists found evidence of leopards in the upper forest and alpine zones of the Pontic Mountains during surveys carried out between 1993 and 2002. Its presence in the Pontic Mountains was questioned in 2016 due to a lack of evidence. A camera trap photograph obtained in Trabzon Province in the Black Sea region in September 2013 is said to show a leopard. Its preferred habitat is thought to be sparse forest areas, followed by rocky areas, agriculture and pasture areas, and riparian zones.
In southeastern Turkey, its presence was documented in the Çınar district of Diyarbakır Province and in Bitlis Province. In 2018 and 2019, it was photographed on the northern slopes of Mount Cudi in Şırnak Province, and this may be a corridor for movement between Turkey and Iraq. It has also been photographed in the north-eastern province of Artvin, which borders Georgia, but whether the animals are resident is not known.

In the Caucasus, leopards were sighted around the Tbilisi area and in the Shida Kartli province in Georgia, where they live primarily in dense forests. Several individuals were sighted in the lowland plains of the Kakheti region in 2004.
Leopard signs were also found at two localities in Tusheti, the headwaters of the Andi Koysu and Assa rivers bordering Dagestan. Leopards are thought to occasionally move through Georgia from Russia, but naturalists hope they might become resident in Georgia in future if well protected in both countries.
During surveys in 2013–2014, camera traps recorded leopards in 24 locations in southern Armenia, of which 14 are in the Zangezur Mountains. This trans-boundary mountain range provides important breeding habitat for leopards in the Lesser Caucasus.
In March 2007 and in October 2012, an individual was photographed by a camera trap in Hirkan National Park. This protected area in southeastern Azerbaijan is in the Talysh Mountains, which are contiguous with the Alborz Mountains in Iran. During surveys in 2013–2014, camera traps recorded leopards in five locations in Hirkan National Park.
The first male leopard crossing from Hirkan National Park into Iran was documented in February 2014. It was killed in the Chubar Highlands in north-western Iran's Gilan Province by a local hunter. This incident indicates that the Talysh Mountains are an important corridor for trans-boundary movement of leopards.
In September 2012, the first female leopard was photographed in Zangezur National Park close to the border with Iran.
During surveys in 2013–2014, camera traps recorded leopards in seven locations in Zangezur National Park, including two different females and one male. All sites are close to the border with Iran.
Five cubs were documented in two sites in the Lesser Caucasus and the Talysh Mountains. Between July 2014 and June 2018, four leopards were identified in the Talysh Mountains and 11 in the trans-boundary region of Nakhchivan and southern Armenia.

Leopards have been sporadically recorded in northern Iraq.
In October 2011 and January 2012, a leopard was photographed by a camera trap on Jazhna Mountain in the Zagros Mountains forest steppe in the Kurdistan Region.
Between 2001 and 2014, at least nine leopards were killed by local people in this region. In 2020, a leopard was recorded in the mountains of the Sulaymaniyah Governorate in the country's northeast.

Iran is considered a stronghold of the leopard in the region. It is more abundant in the northern than in the southern part of the country, and in the 2010s was recorded in 74 of 204 protected areas. The Caspian Hyrcanian mixed forests along the Alborz Mountains are one of the most important habitats for the leopard in the country. Evidence for breeding of leopards was documented in six localities inside protected areas in the Iranian part of the Lesser Caucasus.
In northeastern Iran, four leopard families with two cubs each were identified during a survey carried out from 2005 to 2008 in Sarigol National Park. A male leopard was photographed in January 2008 spraying urine on a Berberis tree; he was photographed several times until mid-February 2008 in the same area. Camera trapping surveys in summer 2016 documented the presence of 52 leopards in Sarigol, Salouk and Tandooreh National Parks. These included 10 cubs in seven families, thus highlighting that the Kopet Dag and Aladagh Mountains are important leopard refugia in the region. Leopards were also photographed in a protected area in Sefid Kuh, Kermanshah in 2020.
Between September 2014 and August 2016, two radio-collared leopards moved from Iran's Kopet Dag region into Turkmenistan, revealing that the leopard population in the two countries is connected. Leopards were recorded by camera traps in the Badkhyz Nature Reserve in the country's south-west.
In 2017, a young male leopard from Iran's Tandooreh National Park dispersed to and settled in Turkmenistan.

In 2018, an old male Persian leopard had moved  from Iran to Turkmenistan.
One individual was recorded by a camera trap in Afghanistan's Bamyan Province in 2011.

In Kazakhstan, a leopard was recorded for the first time in 2000 in Jambyl Region. In 2007 and 2015, two leopards were killed in Mangystau Region farther west in the country. Between September and December 2018, camera traps recorded a leopard on a cliff in Ustyurt Nature Reserve.

Historical range 
P. p. tulliana was most likely distributed over the entire Caucasus, except for the steppe areas. The northern foothills of the Greater Caucasus formed the northern boundary of its historic range. During surveys conducted between 2001 and 2005, no leopard was recorded in the western Greater Caucasus; it probably survived only at a few sites in the eastern part.
In Armenia, people and leopards have co-existed since prehistoric times. In the mid-20th century, the leopard was relatively common in the country's mountains.

Stone traps for leopards and other predators dating to the Roman Empire still exist in the Taurus Mountains in southern Turkey.
The last leopard in Syria is reported to have been killed in 1963 in the Syrian Coastal Mountain Range.
P. p. tulliana was once numerous in the Aegean Region between İzmir and Antalya, with the Beşparmak Mountains considered a stronghold. Several factors contributed to the decline of the leopard population in this region between the late 1940s and mid 1970s, including deforestation, conversion of natural habitat to orchards, road construction and killing of leopards in retaliation for preying on livestock. Since surveys were not carried out in western Turkey until the mid-1980s, biologists doubted whether leopards still survived in the region. Sighting reports from the environs of Alanya in the south of the Lycian peninsula suggested that a scattered population existed between Finike, Antalya and Alanya in the early 1990s. Fresh faecal pellets found in Mount Güllük-Termessos National Park in 1992 were attributed to an Anatolian leopard.
However surveys in western Turkey between 2000 and 2004 found no contemporary evidence of leopards. Extensive trophy hunting is thought to be the prime factor for the decline of the Anatolian leopard in this area. One hunter named Mantolu Hasan killed at least fifteen leopards between 1930 and 1950. It is considered locally extinct in western Turkey since the mid-1970s. No signs of the presence of leopards were detected in Termessos National Park during surveys in 2005, and local people and national park personnel were not aware of any.

The leopard population in southern Russia had been reduced to two small and isolated populations by the 1950s, and by 2007, there were fewer than 50 individuals in the region.
Since 1954, leopards were thought to be extirpated in Georgia, following kills by hunters. The political and social changes caused by the breakup of the Soviet Union in 1992 caused a severe economic crisis and weakening of formerly effective protection systems; wildlife habitats were severely fragmented, leopards were persecuted and wild ungulates were hunted. In addition, inadequate baseline data and lack of monitoring programmes made it difficult to evaluate declines of mammalian prey species.
In the winter of 2003, zoologists found footprints of a leopard in Vashlovani National Park in southeastern Georgia. Camera traps recorded one young male individual several times. The individual was not recorded again between 2009 and 2014. A survey in 2019 found no leopards.

Leopards also survived in northwestern Azerbaijan in the Akhar-Bakhar section of Ilisu State Reserve in the foothills of the Greater Caucasus, but in 2007 numbers were thought to be extremely low.

In Afghanistan, the leopard is thought to inhabit the central highlands of the Hindu Kush and the Wakhan corridor, but none have been photographed. The long-lasting conflict in the country badly affected both predator and prey species, so that the national population is considered to be small and severely threatened.

Behaviour and ecology 
The diet of P. p. tulliana varies depending on habitat.
In southern Armenia and Iran, it preys mostly on wild goat (Capra aegagrus), mouflon (Ovis gmelini), wild boar (Sus scrofa), roe deer (Capreolus capreolus), goitered gazelle (Gazella subgutturosa), Indian crested porcupine (Hystrix indica) and European hare (Lepus europaeus). It occasionally attacks livestock and herding dogs. In Iran, the presence of leopards is highly correlated with the presence of wild goat and wild sheep. An attack by a leopard on an onager (Equus hemionus) was also recorded. In Turkey, it also preys on chamois (Rupicapra rupicapra).

Adult males usually share their home ranges entirely or partially with two or three adult females. The mating season lasts from mid-January to mid-February. In Sarigol National Park, three females were documented in late April to May 2008 with one to two cubs each. A female with two cubs was also photographed in the Alborz Mountains.

Threats 

P. p. tulliana is threatened by poaching, depletion of prey base due to poaching, human disturbance such as presence of military and training of troops in border areas, and habitat loss due to deforestation, fire, agricultural expansion, overgrazing, and infrastructure development.
In the 1980s, anti-personnel mines were deployed along the northern part of the Iran-Iraq border to deter people from entering the area. Leopards roaming the area are safe from poachers and industrial development, but at least two individuals are known to have stepped on mines and been killed. The main threat in northern Iraq is deforestation, which in the early 2020s is being worsened by an economic crisis.

In April 2001, an adult female was shot on the border to Kabardino-Balkaria; her two cubs were captured and taken to Novosibirsk Zoo in Russia.
Between 2004 and 2007, a total of 85 leopard skins were seen being offered in markets in Kabul.
The local prey base could support 4–10 individuals. But the combined impact of poaching, disturbance caused by livestock breeding, gathering of edible plants and mushrooms, deforestation and human-induced wild fires was so high that the tolerance limits of leopards was exceeded.
Only some small and isolated populations remain in the whole Caucasus. Suitable habitat is limited, and most often situated in remote border areas. Local populations depend on immigration from source populations mainly in Iran.

In Turkey, the leopard has been killed illegally in traps and through poison. Several leopards are known of have been killed since 1974 in Beypazarı, Siirt Province, Diyarbakır Province and Tunceli Provinces. Despite ongoing efforts to reforest Turkey, the country lacks a plan to reconnect fragmented forests , which may further fragment leopard populations in the region.

In Iran, primary threats are habitat disturbances, poaching and excess of livestock in leopard habitats. Leopards are unlikely to persist outside of protected areas. Droughts in wide areas of leopard habitats affected the main prey species such as wild goat and wild sheep.
An assessment of leopard mortality in Iran revealed that 71 leopards were killed between 2007 and 2011 in 18 provinces; 70% were hunted or poisoned illegally, and 18% died in road accidents. Between 2000 and 2015, 147 leopards were killed in the country. More than 60% of them died due to poaching, through poisonous bait, and were shot by rangers, trophy hunters and the military. About 26% of them died in road accidents. More males than females were killed.
Between 2007 and spring 2021, 78 leopards died in Iran because of humans; 62 were shot or poisoned by herders or killed by their dogs.
Retaliatory killings of leopards occur after attacks on livestock.
Leopards injured 30 people and killed one in the country between 2012 and 2020, mostly thought to be defensive reactions by animals surprised by livestock herders.

Conservation 

Panthera pardus is listed in CITES Appendix I. It is listed as a strictly protected species in Appendix II of the Berne Convention on the Conservation of European Wildlife and Natural Habitats.
In Azerbaijan, the leopard has been protected by law since 1969; in Armenia and in the Soviet Union, it was protected by law in 1972; the Caucasus leopard population was listed in Russia's Red Data Book under Category I as threatened with extinction.
It has been protected by law in Iran since 1999.
In 2001, hunting leopards was banned in Nakhchivan Autonomous Republic, and anti-poaching activities were regularly conducted in southern Armenia since 2003.
In Georgia's national Red Data Book, the leopard has been listed as Critically Endangered since 2006. Penalties for killing leopards were adopted and increased several times in Armenia and Azerbaijan.
In Afghanistan, it was included in the country's Protected Species List in 2009.
In Kazakhstan, hunting was made a criminal offence in 2021. In Turkey the leopard is one of the species in the action plan being prepared for the country's endangered species.

In 2001, a five-year leopard conservation project was initiated in the Caucasus, which supported systematic surveys in the region, the planning of new and enlargement of existing protected areas, training of border guards and school education campaigns in Armenia and Azerbaijan; an anti-poaching unit was set up in Armenia. In 2005, the Armenian Ministry of Environment approved a conservation plan with the leopard as an umbrella species, and a strategy for leopard conservation in the Caucasus in 2008.
In Iran, a leopard conservation and management action plan was endorsed in 2016, and Future4Leopards Foundation is a non-profit conservation organization in the country. , Nature Iraq is mapping potential habitat near the border with Iran as the first stage of a conservation project.

As of 2022 further conservation work is needed to conserve corridors, including protecting more areas. Three core habitats and suitable corridors between protected areas in the Zagros Mountains were identified along the international border between Iran and Iraq.

In 2021, several authors suggested that there is enough suitable habitat in the Caucasus as a whole for over 1,000 leopards, but a metapopulation will only be viable if persecution is reduced and prey restored.

Reintroduction projects 
In 2009, the Leopard Breeding and Rehabilitation Centre in Russia's Sochi National Park received two leopards from Turkmenistan as part of a leopard breeding and reintroduction programme. Since then, leopards have been brought from various zoos. Their offspring were released into the wild in 2016 and 2018, including three males and one female into the Caucasus Biosphere Reserve, and one male and one female into Alaniya National Park in North Ossetia–Alania.

In captivity 
As of 2021 there are over 100 captive Persian leopards in zoos worldwide, and the European Endangered Species Programme has a captive breeding program to sustain a backup population.

In culture 
In 2015, representations of the Anatolian leopard were found in the ancient city of Thyatira in Anatolia that date from the Neolithic period to the end of the 6th century BC. The leopard is depicted on statues, potteries, ivory works and coins associated with the Lydian culture. Several pieces were found in areas that were used for worship. Leopard skin patterns were also used on Anatolian carpets and kaftans.

The Natural History Museum of the Aegean on Samos Island in Greece exhibits a stuffed animal said to have been killed on the island in 1862, labelled Kaplani, meaning leopard. Its size, shape and coat colour is rather unnatural for a leopard, but may have been altered in the process of taxidermy. One more leopard had reached Samos in 1836 and was trapped.

The story of the leopard and the exhibit inspired Greek author Alki Zei to write a novel for children titled , translated as Wildcat Under Glass.

See also 

Leopard subspecies
Chinese leopard
Zanzibar leopard
Leopard attack
Wildlife of Turkey

References

External links 

 Leopards .:. wild-cat.org — Information about research and conservation of leopards in Asia

Leopards
Mammals of Turkey
Leopard, Persian
Mammals of the Middle East
Leopard, Persian
Mammals of Azerbaijan
Mammals of Russia
Mammals of Central Asia
Felids of Asia
Endangered fauna of Asia